Leon M. Zolbrod (1930 – 16 April 1991) was a scholar and translator of Japanese literature and history.

His interest in studying the literature of Japan developed from his duties as a member of the U.S. Army of occupation in 1948. He earned his Ph.D. from Columbia University (as a graduate student he studied at the Department of Chinese Literature at Tokyo University) before becoming visiting professor of Japanese history and literature at University of British Columbia's Department of Asian Studies in 1967, joining the faculty the following year.

Works
Zolbrod wrote numerous articles and books on the subject of Japanese literature and history. His books included:

References

1930 births
1991 deaths
Japanese–English translators
Columbia Graduate School of Arts and Sciences alumni
Japanese literature academics
Academic staff of the University of British Columbia
20th-century American translators